Caballeronia zhejiangensis is a Gram-negative, non-spore-forming, rod-shaped bacterium from the genus Caballeronia, which was isolated from a wastewater treatment system in China. Caballeronia zhejiangensis has the ability to degrade methyl parathion.

References

Burkholderiaceae
Bacteria described in 2012